Piers Benn (born 1962) is a British philosopher. His research interests include ethics, including medical ethics, philosophy of religion. and the philosophy of psychiatry.

Life
Benn grew up in Blackheath, South East London with parents June, a romantic novelist, and David Wedgwood Benn, a BBC producer and Russian specialist. David was a brother of Labour politician Tony Benn. Piers was educated at Eltham College in Mottingham until 1980, and gained his B.A Hons. degree (First Class) in Philosophy & Modern Languages from Oxford University (Magdalen College, 1984). He received his PhD degree in philosophy ("Human Death: its Nature and Significance") from Birkbeck College, University of London (1992). He has taught at the University of St. Andrews, University of Leeds, Imperial College London (University of London), and King's College London. He is currently (2015) a visiting lecturer at Heythrop College in London, and an adjunct professor at the London Centre of Fordham University New York. He has also written articles in various journals and appeared on British media, including BBC.

His 1997 book Ethics, re-issued by Routledge in 2000, is a textbook for undergraduate courses. The book is both an introduction into the subject and a substantive argument in favor of the neo-Aristotelian view of the objectivity of moral claims.<ref>A review of Benn's Ethics, The Philosophical Quarterly, Vol. 50, No. 200 (2000), pp. 410-412</ref> It covers the following topics, in the corresponding chapters.
 Authority and relativism
 The objectivity of morality
 Consequentialism
 Kant's ethics
 Contractualism
 Free will and the moral emotions
 Virtue
 Reasoning about ethics

His 2011 book 'Commitment' (Acumen Press) is one of the books in Acumen Press' 'Art of Living' series. It discusses the value of, and obstacles to, personal commitment - especially in the areas of love, work, and faith.

 Views 
He was among the 43 signatories of a 2002 letter sent to Tony Blair concerning teaching Creationism in British state-funded schools.

Commenting on Islamophobia in New Humanist, Benn suggests that people who fear the rise of Islamophobia foster an environment "not intellectually or morally healthy", to the point that what he calls "Islamophobia-phobia" can undermine "critical scrutiny of Islam as somehow impolite, or ignorant of the religion's true nature", encouraging "sentimental pretence that all claims to religious truth are somehow 'equal', or that critical scrutiny of Islam (or any belief system) is ignorant, prejudiced, or 'phobic'".

 Bibliography 
Commitment (Art of Living series), Acumen Press 2011.
 Ethics, "Fundamentals of Philosophy" series, McGill-Queen's University Press / UCL Press, 1997  (hardcover),  (paperback, 1998), Routledge, 1997  (paperback),  (hardcover),  (e-book)
 "How Should We Treat the Dead?", in "Thinking about Death], British Humanist Association (2002)

References 

Living people
21st-century British philosophers
Alumni of Birkbeck, University of London
Academics of the University of Leeds
Academics of the University of St Andrews
Academics of Imperial College London
Academics of King's College London
People educated at Eltham College
1962 births